Gastromyzon lepidogaster is a species of river loach (family Balitoridae or Gastromyzontidae, depending on the source). It is endemic to northern Borneo. It inhabits riffles and grows to  standard length.

References 

Gastromyzon
Fish described in 1982
Endemic fauna of Borneo
Fauna of Brunei
Freshwater fish of Indonesia
Freshwater fish of Malaysia
Freshwater fish of Borneo